Beardstown is a city in Cass County, Illinois, United States. The population was 5,951 at the 2020 census. The public schools are in Beardstown Community Unit School District 15.

Geography
Beardstown is located on the Illinois River.

Economy
Beardstown is located on the Illinois River, which plays an important role in the economy and history of the community, and is the site of two grain terminals where farm products are transferred to barges for transport. Hunting, fishing, and outdoor recreation along the river contribute to the local economy.

A large pork slaughterhouse, formerly owned by Kraft and Cargill now by JBS, is a major employer and has attracted a substantial immigrant population to Beardstown in recent years.

Demographics

As of the 2020 census there were 5,951 people, 2,155 households, and 1,352 families residing in the city. The racial makeup of the city was 50.56% White, 11.39% African American, 1.71% Native American, 1.51% Asian, 0.49% Pacific Islander, 23.71% from other races, and 10.62% from two or more races. Hispanic or Latino of any race were 40.43% of the population.

There were 2,155 households, out of which 61.30% had children under the age of 18 living with them, 40.97% were married couples living together, 15.13% had a female householder with no husband present, and 37.26% were non-families. 32.76% of all households were made up of individuals, and 14.80% had someone living alone who was 65 years of age or older. The average household size was 3.18 and the average family size was 2.50.

The city's age distribution consisted of 26.9% under the age of 18, 10.0% from 18 to 24, 27.8% from 25 to 44, 22.8% from 45 to 64, and 12.5% who were 65 years of age or older. The median age was 33.0 years. For every 100 females, there were 94.2 males. For every 100 females age 18 and over, there were 92.4 males.

The median income for a household in the city was $43,425, and the median income for a family was $49,500. Males had a median income of $36,764 versus $25,108 for females. The per capita income for the city was $20,599. About 20.2% of families and 22.4% of the population were below the poverty line, including 25.1% of those under age 18 and 10.0% of those age 65 or over.

History
Beardstown was first settled by Thomas Beard in 1819; he erected a log cabin at the edge of the Illinois River, from which he traded with the local Native Americans and ran a ferry. The town was laid out in 1827 and was incorporated as a city in 1896. During the Black Hawk War in 1832, it was a base of supplies for the Illinois troops.

Thomas Beard's son, Edward "Red" Beard, a noted gambler and saloon keeper of the Old West, was killed in a gunfight in Kansas in 1873 by "Rowdy Joe" Lowe. Earlier, he had built a two-story brick building which was used for 85 years as a store and inn. This inn is alleged to have sheltered Abraham Lincoln on his visits to Beardstown, but that is legend and unconfirmed. The building was demolished and replaced by a post office. William Henry Herndon, Lincoln's Springfield law partner, claimed that Lincoln contracted syphilis from a prostitute in Beardstown, an incident author Gore Vidal colorfully recounts in his historical novel Lincoln (1984).
 
The Beardstown Courthouse was the site of a famous trial which helped build Abraham Lincoln's reputation as a lawyer after he used a copy of a farmer's almanac to undermine the credibility of the prosecution's key witness. The scene was later depicted in a painting by Norman Rockwell. A Lincoln Museum is on the second floor of the courthouse along with many Native American relics.

The Beardstown Ladies

From 1984 to 1993, a group of 16 late-aged women were picking stocks in the Dow Jones and over the course of nine years were claiming returns of 23.4% on their stocks. Once they went public with the amazing returns, they gained national recognition for their success. The Beardstown Ladies, with an average age of 70 (1994), were asked to appear on The Donahue Show, CBS's Morning Show, NBC's The Today Show, and ABC's Good Morning America. For six straight years they were honored by the National Association of Investors Corp's "All-Star Investment Clubs". In 1993, they produced their first home video for investors called, The Beardstown Ladies: Cooking Up Profits on Wall Street. By 1994, they wrote their first book, The Beardstown Ladies' Common-Sense Investment Guide, which sold over 800,000 copies by 1998 and was a New York Times Best Seller. The Beardstown Ladies become a global phenomenon and TV stations from Germany, Brazil, and Japan were interviewing them and taping their monthly meetings in Beardstown. The seeds of scandal were planted in late 1998: a Chicago magazine noticed that the group's returns included the fees the women paid every month. Without them, the returns dwindled to just 9%, underperforming the Dow. An article in The Wall Street Journal led the ladies to hire an outside auditor, which proved they had indeed misstated their returns. Time magazine jokingly stated that they should be jailed for fraud and misrepresentation. , the Beardstown Ladies were still buying stocks. Their books can be bought from Amazon.com for mere pennies.

Notable people 

 William "Duff" Armstrong, accused murderer, was tried in Beardstown and successfully defended by Abraham Lincoln.
 Walter Flanigan, co-founder of National Football League, born in Beardstown.
 Stanley J. Korsmeyer, physician, born in Beardstown,
 Frank McErlane spent his last years here
 Richard Henry Mills, (born 1929) Judge of the United States District Court for the Central District of Illinois (1985–1997). He was born in Beardstown.
 Red Norvo, jazz vibraphone pioneer, born in Beardstown.
 Janice O'Hara, All-American Girls Professional Baseball League player, born in Beardstown.
 Glen Seator (1956—2002), visual artist and architectural sculptor.
 Jesse Wallace, United States Navy Captain and the 27th unique Governor of American Samoa, born in Beardstown.

See also
 Beardstown Community Unit School District 15
 Beardstown Grand Opera House
 List of photographs of Abraham Lincoln
 Fourth principal meridian

References
Notes

"Baseball My Opinion " by Larry Rahn..LCCN # 2008909837...published 10/27/2008

Further reading
 Croll, Philip Columbus, et al. "Thomas Beard, the Pioneer and Founder of Beardstown, Illinois." Journal of the Illinois State Historical Society 10.2 (1917): 207-236. online
 Miraftab, Faranak. Global Heartland: Displaced Labor, Transnational Lives, and Local Placemaking (2016) excerpt, in-depth study of Beardstown by a professor at the University of Illinois. online review

External links

Harvesting the River: Beardstown at the Illinois State Museum website
Beardstown Houston Memorial Library
Beardstown Economic Development — requires JavaScript

Cities in Illinois
Populated places established in 1819
Cities in Cass County, Illinois
1819 establishments in Illinois